'Rio Grande de la Costa 'After passing the Mangrove and a wide river, you can reach the town of Rio Grande de la Costa, from the Gulf which shows the deep Rio Grande inlet.Rio Grande inlet is 34.6 km of Guiria

with about 40 people, and although it has nearly four centuries of history, its colonial past can be seen in the splendid colonial houses in Plaza Bolivar, and some old buildings.

Origin 
 -The town's name comes from the great river that has its source in the mountains: The Rio Grande

Quick facts 

 -Currency: Bolívar fuerte (VEF)
 -Economy : Fishing, Agriculture and Tourism.
 -Electricity:110/60.
 -Coordinates:10° 39' 22.44" N 62° 7' 30.39" W
 -country code: 58
 -Official language:Español .
 -Religion:Most of the population is Christian religious.
 -Patron Saint:Virgen del Carmen - August

People 
Most of the people in Rio Grande are of Trinidadian descent.

Geography 
Rio Grande de la Costa is located in the Cristobal Colon Parish - Paria Peninsula in Sucre state, Valdez Municipality, Most of the surface consists of a mountainous terrain with some small valleys and rivers flowing into the sea. is largely covered by rainforest .

Limits 

 To the North: limits with the Sucre parish belonging to Municipio Arismendi, by the "mountain range" of the Paria Peninsula.
 To the South: with the Golf of Paria Golfo de Paria.
 To the East: borders the dragons mouth and the Gulf of Paria, certainly bordering Trinidad waters for a few kilometers to the end of the peninsula with the international territory.
 To the West: with the Bideau Parish belonging to Municipio_Valdez.

Rio Grande Cove 
This Cove is home to several fishermen families. Have a small river that supplies the population requirements of this important liquid. This bay is open to the south. The beach is 100 meters long

Climate 
Rio Grande de la Costa, is in the tropics, enjoy a tropical climate influenced by the Maritime northeast winds., average temperature is 26 °C, and the average maximum temperature is 34 °C during the day and 20 °C on average at night. Humidity is high, particularly during the wet season, when the 85% average. receives an average of 211 cm ³ of rain per year, usually concentrated in the months from June to December, when in brief, intense floods occur frequently. The precipitation increases in the North Range, where you can receive up to 381 cm ³. During the dry season, the drought attack the top center of the territory.is outside of the hurricane zone..

Gallery

See also 
 Sucre (state)

External links

 Rio Grande de la Costa Tourism Foundation official web site 
 Rio Grande Cove weather
 Rio Grande Cove
 Güiria- Rio Grande de la Costa - Reto Caribe
  (census 2001)
 Electoral Registration 

Populated places in Sucre (state)